Yacopí is a municipality and town of Colombia in the department of Cundinamarca.

References

Municipalities of Cundinamarca Department